"Fixed Star" is the 13th single released by the J-pop singer Mami Kawada. It was scheduled to be released on February 20, 2013, one week after the release of her compilation album Mami Kawada BEST ~BIRTH~. The track is used as is the ending theme song of the movie Toaru Majutsu no Index: Endyumion no Kiseki.

The song was also critically acclaimed by many in the entertainment industry.

Track listing 
 Fixed Star
Lyrics: Mami Kawada
Composition: Tomoyuki Nakazawa
Arrangement: Tomoyuki Nakazawa, Takeshi Ozaki
 intersection
Lyrics: Mami Kawada
Composition and Arrangement: TBA
 Fixed Star (instrumental)
 intersection (instrumental)

2013 singles
2013 songs
Mami Kawada songs
A Certain Magical Index music
Anime songs
Japanese film songs
Songs written for animated films
Songs with lyrics by Mami Kawada